Vice Admiral John Henry Stuart McAnally,  (born 9 April 1945) is a former Royal Navy officer who served as Commandant of the Royal College of Defence Studies from 1998 to 2001.

He was educated at Willington School in Putney and then Westminster School.

Naval career
McAnally was commissioned as a sub-lieutenant in the Royal Navy on 1 September 1964. After a number of postings, he served on HMY Britannia from 1980 and was made a Member (later Lieutenant) of the Royal Victorian Order in 1982. He went on to be Assistant Director of Naval Plans in 1989, Director of Naval Logistics Policy in 1993 and Director of Naval Staff Duties in 1994. After that he became Flag Officer, Training and Recruitment in 1996 and Commandant of the Royal College of Defence Studies in 1998. He was appointed Companion of the Order of the Bath in 2000 and retired in 2001.

Retirement
In retirement McAnally became an advisor to Flagship Training and chairman of the Naval and Military Club in London.

He has been National President of the Royal Naval Association since 2001.

References

1945 births
Living people
Companions of the Order of the Bath
Lieutenants of the Royal Victorian Order
Royal Navy vice admirals
People educated at Westminster School, London
Military personnel from Surrey